A number of Russian generals have been killed during the 2022 Russian invasion of Ukraine. As of 11 July 2022, Ukrainian sources claimed that 14 Russian generals had been killed during the invasion. Although some claims were rebutted, the loss of even two general officers is rare. The scale of these losses is unprecedented since World War II. This has been attributed to Russian senior commanders going to the field to  address "difficulties in command and control" and "faltering Russian performance on the front line", insecure communication by Russian forces, and United States military intelligence that allowed the Ukrainians to target Russian officers.

List 
Russia has confirmed the death of four generals. Ukraine has claimed the deaths of four additional generals which Russia has neither confirmed nor denied.

On 23 April 2022, Ukraine's Ministry of Defence claimed a strike on a Russian 49th Combined Arms Army command post in Kherson Oblast killed two generals and critically injured one. The names of the two generals were not released at the time of the report.

Rebutted reports
The reported deaths of four Russian generals have been rebutted.

General-Major Artem Nasbulin, listed as Commander, 22nd Army Corps, was reported by Odesa Oblast representative Serhiy Bratchuk as killed, along with 3 officers and over 140 others, following a Ukrainian strike on a Russian command post in Tavriisk, Kherson Oblast, on 12 July 2022. However, The Moscow Times could not find any evidence supporting Nasbulin's existence.

Analysis 

Analysts at the Jerusalem Institute for Security and Strategy and the French Institute of International Relations found that the number of Russian generals killed during the 2022 Russian invasion of Ukraine suggests that poor morale among Russian forces and a slow advance into Ukraine forced high-ranking officers to put themselves at risk in an effort to achieve military objectives. UK intelligence attributed the deaths of senior commanders to their going to the field to personally lead operations to address "difficulties in command and control" and "faltering Russian performance on the front line." Western governments say at least ten Russian generals have been killed, which they attribute to major strategic errors. The Japanese government estimates that 20 Russian generals have been killed in the war, based on intelligence gathered by Japan in cooperation with the United States and Europe; retired general , former chief of staff of the Japan Ground Self-Defense Force, described the tally as "unbelievably high".

In addition to these flag officers, many other senior officers have been killed by Ukrainian forces; on 23 March, Ukrainian official Mykhailo Podoliak stated that their forces had killed "dozens of colonels and other officers". That day, The Times counted five Russian colonels killed in Ukraine so far. On 11 May, The Independent reported a total of 42 colonels allegedly killed. By the end of April, at least 317 Russian officers had been killed, a third of them majors, lieutenant colonels, and colonels. A Ukrainian official told The Wall Street Journal that a unit of Ukrainian military intelligence was collecting information on the positions of Russian officers, including generals, artillery commanders, and pilots.  High-ranking casualties in the Russian Navy include Captain 1st Rank Andrei Paliy,  deputy commander of the Black Sea Fleet.  Anton Kurpin, the commander of the Russian cruiser Moskva, has also been reported as killed, although Russia has not confirmed this.

The Russian military is top-heavy, with generals playing a larger role in day-to-day operations than in other militaries. Russian battalion commanders were given more authority only three years before the invasion. According to analysts and Western officials, Russia had deployed approximately 20 general officers to Ukraine. Michael McFaul, former U.S. ambassador to Russia, described the number of Russian generals killed as "a shocking number", while General David Petraeus, the former director of the CIA and commander of Coalition troops in Iraq, remarked that it is "very uncommon" for so many generals to be killed and that the Ukrainian military was "picking them off left and right". The Washington Post stated that generals were "killed at a rate not seen since World War II".

The deaths of Russian officers on the front line have been attributed to a number of Russian vulnerabilities in Ukraine, including the use of unsecured communications and the movement of officers to the front line to boost flagging morale and address discipline issues, such as looting. The use of unsecured phones has been attributed to the failure of Russia's secure telephone technology system, Era. In March 2022, two American military officials told The New York Times that Russian generals in Ukraine frequently had conversations on unsecured phones and radios, and that in at least one instance, a general and his staff were killed after the Ukrainians intercepted a call, geolocated it, and attacked the location.  The New York Times also reported that U.S. intelligence has provided real-time intelligence to help the Ukrainian military target Russian generals.

See also 

 Army ranks and insignia of the Russian Federation
 Casualties of the Russo-Ukrainian War
 Military history of the Russian Federation
 Order of battle for the 2022 Russian invasion of Ukraine
 Combatants of the war in Donbas
 List of military engagements during the 2022 Russian invasion of Ukraine
 Timeline of the 2022 Russian invasion of Ukraine

References

External links 
 List of Russian senior officers (including puppet forces) killed during the invasion, Topcargo200

Russian generals killed during the 2022 invasion of Ukraine
Russian generals
 
History of Russia (1991–present)
Military history of Russia